Stones in the Road is the fifth studio album by American country music artist Mary Chapin Carpenter, and her first and only #1 Country Album on the Billboard charts. The album also contains her first and only #1 Hot Country Singles hit, "Shut Up and Kiss Me." Other charting singles were "Tender When I Want to Be" at #6, "House of Cards" at #21, and "Why Walk When You Can Fly?" at #45.  The nostalgically themed title track was first recorded by folk singer Joan Baez for her 1992 studio album Play Me Backwards, to whom Carpenter first pitched the song during a joint concert appearance before she recorded it herself. It was also featured in the 1995 film Bye Bye Love.

Carpenter earned two Grammy Awards in 1995 for her work on the album: Best Country Album and Best Female Country Vocal Performance (for "Shut Up and Kiss Me"), the fourth straight year she won the latter category.

Country Universe called it the best Contemporary Country Album.

Track listing

Personnel
Adapted from Stones in the Road liner notes.

Musicians
 Kenny Aronoff - drums (2, 3, 5, 6, 10, 11, 13), percussion (11, 13)
 Paul Brady - tin whistle (10), background vocals (10)
 J. T. Brown - fretless bass (1, 8), bass guitar (4, 7)
 Mary Chapin Carpenter - vocals; acoustic guitar (all tracks except 12), background vocals (1, 2, 4, 10)
 Jon Carroll - piano (1, 7, 8), accordion (1)
 Shawn Colvin - background vocals (10)
 Don Dixon - bass guitar (2, 3, 5, 6, 10, 11, 13), arco bass (5)
 Stuart Duncan - fiddle (1), mandolin (1)
 John Jennings - electric guitar (2, 4, 5, 7, 13), acoustic guitar (1, 3, 4), baritone guitar (5, 6, 11), background vocals (2, 4, 6),  Hammond C-3 organ (4), percussion (4), cowbell (6), plucked piano (8), bass guitar (8), "beach guitar" (10, 13)
 Robbie Magruder - drums (1, 4, 7, 8)
 Branford Marsalis - soprano saxophone (9)
 Alan O'Bryant - background vocals (1)
 Lee Roy Parnell - electric slide guitar (6, 13)
 Matt Rollings - piano (1, 4, 12, 13)
 Steuart Smith - electric guitar (2, 3, 4, 5, 8, 11, 13)
 Benmont Tench - Hammond C-3 organ (2, 3, 11), piano (3, 6, 10, 11, 13)
 Robin and Linda Williams - background vocals (1)
 Trisha Yearwood - background vocals (5, 6)

Production
 Mary Chapin Carpenter - producer
 Dave Chavez - recording assistant
 Bob Dawson - recording, mixing
 Caroline Greyshock - photography
 John Jennings - producer
 Bill Johnson - art direction
 Denny Purcell - mastering
 James Saez - additional recording

Charts

Weekly charts

Year-end charts

References

Columbia Records albums
Mary Chapin Carpenter albums
1994 albums
Grammy Award for Best Country Album